Hazelia is a genus of spicular Cambrian demosponge known from the Burgess Shale, the Marjum formation of Utah, and possibly Chengjiang. It was described by Charles Walcott in 1920.

Its tracts are mainly radial and anastomose to form an irregular skeleton.  Its oxeas form a fine net in the skin of the sponge.

References

External links 
 

Protomonaxonida
Burgess Shale sponges
Maotianshan shales fossils
Cambrian first appearances
Middle Ordovician extinctions
Prehistoric sponge genera
Taxa named by Charles Doolittle Walcott
Fossil taxa described in 1920

Cambrian genus extinctions